Puerto Morelos Lighthouse is an active lighthouse in the town and port of Puerto Morelos, on the Riviera Maya in the state of Quintana Roo, Mexico. The current lighthouse is the third in a succession of lights that have operated at the site on the seafront, close to the main pier.

History
Little is known about the original light when the station was started in 1905, but the second lighthouse built in 1946 is well known as the Faro Inclinado, and a symbol of the town.

The leaning tower was the result of the foundations being washed away by Hurricane Beulah in September 1967.

The third lighthouse which was built in the 1980s but further back from the beach, was also damaged by another hurricane, this time by Wilma in 2005, with the top of the 14m high cylinder-shaped tower requiring repairs, and repainting. This current light has a focal height of 16m above sea level, with a range of 15 nautical miles and consists of a flash of white light every six seconds.

The lighthouse is operated and maintained by the Secretariat of Communications and Transportation, and is registered under the Admiralty number J4438 and has the NGA identifier of 110–15704.

See also

List of lighthouses in Mexico

References

External links

Lighthouses in Mexico
Buildings and structures in Quintana Roo
Lighthouses completed in 1988
Lighthouses completed in 1905
Lighthouses completed in 1946
Inclined towers
1905 establishments in Mexico